The 1990 Geneva European Open was a women's tennis tournament played on outdoor clay courts in Geneva, Switzerland that was part of the Tier IV category of the 1990 WTA Tour. It was the 14th edition of the tournament and was held from 21 May until 27 May 1990. Second-seeded Barbara Paulus won the singles title.

Finals

Singles
 Barbara Paulus defeated  Helen Kelesi 2–6, 7–5, 7–6(7–3)
 It was Paulus' 1st singles title of the year and the 2nd of her career.

Doubles
 Louise Field /  Dianne Van Rensburg defeated  Elise Burgin /  Betsy Nagelsen 5–7, 7–6(7–2), 7–5

References

External links
 ITF tournament edition details
 Tournament draws

European Open
WTA Swiss Open
1990 in Swiss tennis
1990 in Swiss women's sport